The Iron Man statue is a ,  sculpture depicting what could be the Buddhist deity Vaiśravaṇa that may be made from a rare ataxite class nickel-rich iron meteorite. It is claimed to be Tibetan and to have been carved circa 1000 CE, from a meteorite that fell to Earth approximately 15,000 years ago, although no evidence for this claim has been provided.

Albeit claims that the statue may have been acquired by the 1938–1939 German expedition to Tibet, evidence of the statue's provenance has not been presented to date. The statue was kept in a private collection in Germany until it is said to have been auctioned in 2007. The figure is adorned with a counterclockwise-rotation Buddhist swastika.

Analysis

The material has been dated to the time of the Chinga meteorite, which fell near eastern Siberia and Mongolia between 10,000 and 20,000 years ago. Elmar Buchler, the researcher who had determined the statue's composition has said, "If we are right that it was made in the Bon culture in the eleventh century, it is absolutely priceless and absolutely unique worldwide."

Controversy
General features on the statue still raise doubts about its true nature and origin. There are doubts that this statue was created in Tibet or that it could be related to Buddhist beliefs. Even the authors of the meteorite theory express several concerns and remarked that their assessment of it being carved in the eleventh century is mere speculation.

It was noted that this statue is not present on the list of items brought to Germany by the expedition, which is deemed to be "very precise".

If the statue is genuine, the nearest possible resemblance to a national dress would be Scythian. Not all details fit such resemblance, however, such as the remarkable double sleeved coat that fails to be associated with examples of Scythian clothing and the distinctive cut cuff of the pant legs. Certain groups of Scythians (Indo-Scythians/Sakas 200BCE-400CE) were influenced by Buddhism and their kingdoms bordered modern Tibet on the west. While the last remains of a Scythian state vanished in the fifth century, pockets, in the form of tribes, may have survived in the Himalayas up to the tenth century. This may go well with assumptions made about the possible date of the statue's carving and even give ground to the hypothesis on the origin of primary material.

See also
 Glossary of meteoritics
 Thokcha, the Tibetan use of meteorite metal in ritual objects

References

External links
 Article with photograph of Ironman statue

11th-century sculptures
Bon
Buddhist sculpture
Iron sculptures
Meteorites in culture
Tibetan art